Villebadin is a former commune in the Orne department in north-western France. On 1 January 2017, it was merged into the new commune Gouffern en Auge.

Heraldry

Manoir

From 1969 archeologist Robert du Mesnil du Buisson worked to raise funds to restore the local manoir.

See also
Communes of the Orne department

References

Former communes of Orne